Brateș is a commune in Covasna County, Transylvania, Romania composed of three villages:

 Brateș
 Pachia / Páké
Telechia / Orbaitelek

History 

It formed part of the Székely Land region of the historical Transylvania province. Until 1918, the village belonged to the Háromszék County of the Kingdom of Hungary. After the Treaty of Trianon of 1920, it became part of Romania.

Demographics

The commune has an absolute Székely Hungarian majority. According to the 2002 census, it has a population of 1,548, of which 98.97% or 1,532 are Hungarian.

References

Communes in Covasna County
Localities in Transylvania